Korolyovo is a rural locality (a selo) in Yevbulyaksky Selsoviet, Askinsky District, Bashkortostan, Russia. The population was 54 as of 2010. There is 1 street.

Geography 
Korolyovo is located 15 km south of Askino (the district's administrative centre) by road. Yevbulyak is the nearest rural locality.

References 

Rural localities in Askinsky District